Libya competed at the 2012 Summer Olympics in London, United Kingdom from 27 July to 12 August 2012. This was the nation's tenth appearance at the Olympics since its debut at the 1964 Summer Olympics in Tokyo, including seven appearances under the name Libyan Arab Jamahiriya.

Five Libyan athletes were selected to the team, competing only in 4 different sports. Weightlifter Al El-Kekli, however, later withdrew from the Olympic games over an unspecified injury. Swimmer Sofyan El Gadi, the youngest athlete of the team, at age 20, was the nation's flag bearer at the opening ceremony. Libya, however, has yet to win its first ever Olympic medal.

Athletics

Libyan athletes have so far achieved qualifying standards in the following athletics events (up to a maximum of 3 athletes in each event at the 'A' Standard, and 1 at the 'B' Standard):

Key
 Note – Ranks given for track events are within the athlete's heat only
 Q = Qualified for the next round
 q = Qualified for the next round as a fastest loser or, in field events, by position without achieving the qualifying target
 NR = National record
 N/A = Round not applicable for the event
 Bye = Athlete not required to compete in round

Men

Women

Judo

Swimming

Men

Weightlifting

Libya has qualified 1 athlete.

References

External links
 
 

Nations at the 2012 Summer Olympics
2012
Olympics